George William Byers (born 29 May 1996) is a professional footballer who plays as a midfielder for Sheffield Wednesday.

Club career

Watford
Byers is a youth product of the Watford academy, joining the club aged 7. He was included in the 2013–14 pre-season camp in Italy. On 12 May 2014, Byers signed a professional deal with Watford.

On 17 January 2015, Byers made his senior debut as a substitute in a match against Charlton Athletic.

On 3 June 2016, it was announced that Byers would leave Watford upon the expiration of his contract.

Swansea City
On 11 July 2016, preceding Byers' release from Watford, he joined Premier League rivals Swansea City. He made his debut for Swansea on 28 August 2018 in a 1–0 defeat to Crystal Palace in the EFL Cup.

On 23 January 2021, Byers joined League One side Portsmouth on loan for the remainder of the 2020–21 season.

Sheffield Wednesday
On 3 August 2021, Byers joined League One side Sheffield Wednesday on a two-year deal, with Swansea City including a sell on clause. He would make his Wednesday debut coming off the bench against Doncaster Rovers on 14 August 2021. He would score his first goal for the club in the EFL Trophy against Harrogate Town on 9 November 2021.
Byers would make his first league appearance since November against Morecambe at the start of February 2022, and would be ever present for the whole month, picking up the club’s  player of the month award and scoring three times.

International career
Byers has represented Scotland at both under-16 and under-17 level.

Career statistics

Honours
Portsmouth
EFL Trophy runner-up: 2019–20

References

External links

1996 births
Living people
Footballers from Ilford
English footballers
Scottish footballers
Scotland youth international footballers
Association football midfielders
Watford F.C. players
Swansea City A.F.C. players
Portsmouth F.C. players
Sheffield Wednesday F.C. players
English Football League players
English people of Scottish descent